Centralia is an unincorporated community in Trinity County, Texas, United States.  Located on Farm Road 357, it lies 15 miles northeast of Groveton. In 2000, the estimated population was 53 residents. Former legislator DH Hamilton, who is the great grandfather of former Governor Rick Perry, resided here.

Historical development
The town was originally settled around the time of the Civil War, with the town square being established the following decade. As the town was located between Nogalus Prairie and Apple Springs, it was given the name Centralia. In 1874 the post office was opened and over the next 11 years, the town would grow to have a population of 150 residents, along with the addition of two general stores, several stream sawmills and gristmills. As late as 1914, the population would be at its peak at 300. Subsequent to World War I, businesses would begin to close with the town’s population dwindling down over the next several decades.

References

Unincorporated communities in Trinity County, Texas
Unincorporated communities in Texas